Little Elbow Lake is a lake in Mahnomen County, in the U.S. state of Minnesota.

Little Elbow Lake was so named on account of its outline being bent like an elbow.

See also
List of lakes in Minnesota

References

Lakes of Minnesota
Lakes of Mahnomen County, Minnesota